XO-4b is an extrasolar planet approximately 956 light years away in the constellation of Lynx. This planet was found by the transit method by McCullough in May 2008. The planet has mass  and radius . This planet orbits very close to the F-type parent star, as it is typical for transiting planets, classing this planet as Hot Jupiter.

Orbit
It takes only 4.125 days (or 99 hours) to orbit at a distance of 8.3 gigameters (0.0555 AU) away from the star.

The study in 2012, utilizing a Rossiter–McLaughlin effect, have determined the planetary orbit is strongly misaligned with the equatorial plane of the star, misalignment equal to -46.7°.

Naming
The planet XO-4b is named Hämarik. The name was selected in the NameExoWorlds campaign by Estonia, during the 100th anniversary of the IAU. Hämarik is Estonian for dusk, and was named for a character in a folk tale written by Friedrich Robert Faehlmann.

See also
 XO Telescope

References

External links

 

Hot Jupiters
Lynx (constellation)
Transiting exoplanets
Giant planets
Exoplanets discovered in 2008
Exoplanets with proper names